Myloplus lucienae is a medium to large omnivorous fish of the family Serrasalmidae from Brazil.

Etymology
The fish is named in honor of Luciene Maria Kassar Borges, in recognition for her attempt in a 1986 Ph.D. dissertation to organize the knowledge of the herbivorous Serrasalmidae from the Rio Negro basin.

References

Serrasalmidae
Freshwater fish of Brazil
Taxa named by Marcelo Costa Andrade
Taxa named by Rafaela Priscila Ota
Taxa named by Douglas A. Bastos 
Taxa named by Michel Louis Arthur Marie Ange François Jégu
Fish described in 2016